Putney Houses are a set of two historic homes located in Richmond, Virginia.  The Samuel Putney House at 1010 E. Marshall Street is a three-story, three bay Italianate style townhouse with rich architectural decoration. It features a delicate cast iron, one-story porch across the first story. The neighboring Stephen Putney House at 1012 E. Marshall Street is a three-story, three-bay stuccoed brick dwelling crowned by a bracketed cornice. It features magnificent two-story verandah of ornamental iron on the east side. Both Putney Houses were built in 1859, and have extensive rear ells. The ornamental ironwork is a product of the local Phoenix Iron Works.

It was listed on the National Register of Historic Places in 1969.

References

Houses on the National Register of Historic Places in Virginia
Italianate architecture in Virginia
Houses completed in 1859
Houses in Richmond, Virginia
National Register of Historic Places in Richmond, Virginia